Joshua Buatsi (born 14 March 1993) is a British professional boxer who held the British light-heavyweight title in 2019, and the WBA International light-heavyweight title between 2018 and 2021. As an amateur, he won a bronze medal in the light-heavyweight division at the 2016 Olympics in Rio de Janeiro, Brazil.

Buatsi is managed by two-time world heavyweight champion Anthony Joshua.

Early life
Buatsi was born on 14 March 1993 in Accra, Ghana. After his family moved to the UK, they resided in Thornton Heath in south London. Buatsi studied at Edenham High School. Buatsi graduated with a 2:1 degree in Management with Sports Science from St Mary's University, Twickenham, while also competing as an amateur boxer.

Amateur career

Buatsi started his early boxing career at the South Norwood and Victory club, Charnwood Road, Crystal Palace, London, England. His trainer, Terry Smith, worked hard with Buatsi right up until he signed with Hearn's Matchroom Boxing. Mark Gillespie, the second coach at SNaV, followed Buatsi into the professional circuit both leaving their amateur roots.

At the 2016 European Boxing Olympic Qualification Tournament held in Samsun, Turkey, Buatsi defeated Ukraine's Oleksandr Khyzhniak in his semi-final and Dutch boxer Peter Müllenberg in the final of the light-heavyweight tournament to secure his place in Rio as part of the Great Britain team.

At the 2016 Summer Olympics in the men's light-heavyweight competition, he defeated Elshod Rasulov of Uzbekistan with a third-round knockout, to progress to the quarter finals.

Professional career

Early career
Buatsi made his professional debut on 1 July 2017, when he fought Carlos Mena at The O2 Arena. Buatsi won the fight by knockout in the second round. He next fought on 1 September against Baptiste Castegnaro, winning by knockout in the fifth round. On 28 October 2017, on the undercard of Anthony Joshua vs. Carlos Takam at the Principality Stadium in Cardiff, Wales, Buatsi fought Saidou Sall in a six round bout, winning the bout 60-54.

Buatsi’s first fight of 2018 was against Jordan Joseph, he won the bout by stoppage in the second round after Joseph’s corner threw the towel in. He went on to defeat Bartlomiej Grafka 60-54 over six rounds on 31 March and Stephane Cuevas by knockout in the fifth round on the undercard of Tony Bellew vs. David Haye on 5 May.

On 23 March 2019, Buatsi defeated Liam Conroy via technical knockout in round three to claim the vacant British light-heavyweight title at the Copper Box Arena in London, England.

In his US debut, on the Anthony Joshua vs. Andy Ruiz Jr. undercard at Madison Square Garden, Buatsi defeated Mexican veteran and former title challenger Marco Antonio Peribán within four rounds. Buatsi first dropped his opponent, and after he got up, unleashed a flurry of shots at him, forcing the referee to stop the fight.

In his next fight, Buatsi faced another veteran, Canadian Ryan Ford. Ford proved to be a good test for the young Buatsi, but in the end, Buatsi managed to get a seventh-round stoppage.

On 15 May 2021, Buatsi fought Frenchman Daniel Dos Santos at the AO Arena in Manchester, winning by devastating knockout with a well-timed right hand in the fourth round. Buatsi followed this up by beating Ričards Bolotņiks with an eleventh round knock out as the main event on the final instalment of Matchroom Boxing's Fight Camp series. For the last two fights, Joshua has been under the tutelage of Virgil Hunter, the former trainer of Andre Ward, with both of his most recent camps taking place at Virgil's gym in California.

Professional boxing record

References

External links 
 
 
 
 
 
Joshua Buatsi - Profile, News Archive & Current Rankings at Box.Live

1993 births
Living people
Boxers from Accra
Ghanaian emigrants to England
English male boxers
People from Croydon
Boxers at the 2016 Summer Olympics
Olympic boxers of Great Britain
Medalists at the 2016 Summer Olympics
Black British sportsmen
Olympic bronze medallists for Great Britain
Olympic medalists in boxing
Boxers from Greater London
Alumni of St Mary's University, Twickenham
Boxers at the 2015 European Games
European Games competitors for Great Britain
Light-heavyweight boxers
British Boxing Board of Control champions